The cost of operation is the business strategy implemented in many companies to gain a huge market. The cost of operation is the cost acquired in completing one operation. It may be a conversion of inputs into the outputs or labor costs etc. If the cost of operation is low then it is easy to maintain cost leadership and gain the market with competitive advantage.

See also
 Operating cost
 Loss leader

References

Strategic management